The Grande-Anse River flows through western Haiti and empties into the Gulf of Gonâve at the city of Jérémie. It is one of the largest rivers in Haiti.

It is also one of the most dangerous rivers in Haiti. Many people died trying to cross the river by truck in the last decades. Most recently, bridges have been constructed over the river linking Aux-Cayes in the south department to Jeremie in the Grand'Anse department.

References

Rivers of Haiti